Li County, or Lixian is a county in Hunan Province, China, it is under the administration of the prefecture-level city of Changde.

Administrative divisions

According to the result on adjustment of township-level administrative divisions of Li County, Hunan on November 23, 2015, Li County has 15 towns and four subdistricts under its jurisdiction. they are:

15 towns
 Cennan
 Chengtoushan Town
 Dayandang

 Fuxing, Li County
 Ganxitan
 Guanyuan, Li County
 Huolianpo
 Jinluo, Li County
 Linan, Li County
 Matoupu, Li County
 Mengxi, Li County
 Rudong, Li County

 Wangjiachang
 Xiaodukou
 Yanjing, Li County

4 Subdistricts
 Lidan Subdistrict,
 Lipu, Li County
 Lixi, Li County
 Liyang Subdistrict

Famous Sights 
Chengtoushan Site:  Chengtoushan is an prehistoric site which located in the village of Lanyue in the township of Chexi. This site is situated on a small plateau-like feature in the landscape, two or three meters above the surrounding area. The local villagers call it Pingtoushan("Flat Top Hill"). It has also been known for generations as the location of an ancient walled site.

Special Status
Lixian is the seat of an Apostolic Prefecture in the consideration of the Roman Catholic Church; this status is unrecognised in the organisational structure of Sinican Catholicism promulgated by the Chinese Patriotic Catholic Association.

Climate

Notes and references

 
Changde
County-level divisions of Hunan